Eternal River (German: Ewiger Strom) is a 1920 German silent drama film directed by Johannes Guter and starring Werner Krauss, Marija Leiko and Heinrich Peer.

The film's sets were designed by the art director Robert Neppach. It premiered at the Marmorhaus in Berlin.

Cast
 Werner Krauss as Ein Fährmann 
 Marija Leiko as Marija, ein Mädchen 
 Heinrich Peer as Professor Anton Weniaan 
 F.W. Schröder-Schrom as Ingenieur Jan Bruun 
 Gerhard Tandar as Kapitänin, Gerhard Wenlaan 
 Vladimir Agayev as Russischer Student 
 Bamboula as Ein schwarzer Millionär

References

Bibliography
 Giesen, Rolf. The Nosferatu Story: The Seminal Horror Film, Its Predecessors and Its Enduring Legacy. McFarland, 2019.

External links

1920 films
Films of the Weimar Republic
Films directed by Johannes Guter
German silent feature films
German black-and-white films